Stephansortia is a genus of beetles in the family Buprestidae, containing the following species:

 Stephansortia cyanipennis Thery, 1925
 Stephansortia torreana Levey, 1992

References

Buprestidae genera